The 2009 Copa Petrobras Buenos Aires was a professional tennis tournament played on outdoor clay courts. It was part of the 2009 ATP Challenger Tour. It took place in Buenos Aires, Argentina between 28 September and 4 October 2009.

Singles main draw entrants

Seeds

 Rankings are as of September 21, 2009.

Other entrants
The following players received wildcards into the singles main draw:
  Facundo Bagnis
  Mariano Zabaleta
  Guido Pella
  Mariano Puerta

The following players received entry from the qualifying draw:
  Carlos Berlocq
  Alejandro Fabbri
  Andrés Molteni
  Lionel Noviski

Champions

Singles

 Horacio Zeballos def.  Gastón Gaudio, 6–2, 3–6, 6–3

Doubles

 Brian Dabul /  Sergio Roitman def.  Máximo González /  Lucas Arnold Ker, 6–4, 7–5

External links
Official website
ITF Search 

Copa Petrobras Buenos Aires
Clay court tennis tournaments
Tennis tournaments in Argentina
2009 in Argentine tennis